The Brown Bears represent Brown University in ECAC women's ice hockey. The Bears did not qualify for the NCAA tournament. The top scorers for the Bears were two sophomore forwards; Laurie Jolin, (10 goals, 7 assists), and Alena Polenska, (10 goals, 7 assists) shared the lead with 17 points, respectively.

Offseason
August 12: The Czech National women's ice hockey program announced that Bears sophomore Alena Polenska has been named captain for its Olympic Development Team.

Exhibition

Recruiting

Regular season
November 14: Kate Jamieson earned her first shutout of the season as the Bears defeated RPI by a 1-0 tally. The sophomore goaltender made thirty-seven saves.

Standings

Schedule

Conference record

Awards and honors
Katie Jamieson, Brown, ECAC MLX Skates Defensive Player of the Week, (Week of November 16)

Team awards
Team MVP: Samantha Stortini
Academic Excellence Award: Katelyn Landry
Chelsea McMillan Pride and Perseverance Award: Paige Pyatt
Panda Cup: Erica Kromm
Sakuma Award: Katelyn Landry, Katie Jamieson, Jennifer Nedow, Jessica Hoyle, and Kelly Kittredge
Tara Mounsey Award: Samantha Woodward

See also
2009–10 Brown Bears women's ice hockey season

References

B
B
Brown Bears women's ice hockey seasons